Magadi Assembly constituency is one of the 224 constituencies in the Karnataka Legislative Assembly of Karnataka a south state of India. It is also part of Bangalore Rural Lok Sabha constituency.

Members of Legislative Assembly

Mysore State
 1951: S. Siddappa, Indian National Congress

 1957: B. Singri Gowda, Praja Socialist Party

 1962: C. R. Rangegowda, Praja Socialist Party

 1967: C. R. Rangegowda, Praja Socialist Party

 1972: H. G. Channappa, Independent

Karnataka State
 1978: Bettaswamy Gowda, Janata Party

 1983: H. G. Channappa, Indian National Congress

 1985: H. G. Channappa, Janata Party

 1989: H. M. Revanna, Indian National Congress

 1994: H.C. Balakrishna, Bharatiya Janata Party

 1999: H. M. Revanna, Indian National Congress

 2004: H.C. Balakrishna, Janata Dal (Secular)

 2008: H.C. Balakrishna, Janata Dal (Secular)

 2013: H.C. Balakrishna, Janata Dal (Secular)

 2018: A. Manjunath, Janata Dal (Secular)

See also
 Ramanagara district
 List of constituencies of Karnataka Legislative Assembly

References

Assembly constituencies of Karnataka
Ramanagara district